Time in Sri Lanka since  is officially represented by the Sri Lanka Standard Time (SLST, UTC+05:30).

Historic UTC offsets were:
 UTC+05:30
 UTC+06:00
 UTC+06:30

Daylight saving time
In history daylight saving time was used too.

IANA time zone database
The IANA time zone database contains one zone for Sri Lanka in the file zone.tab, named Asia/Colombo.

See also
 Sri Lanka Standard Time

External links
 Official website for Sri Lanka Standard Time